The Confessional Evangelical Lutheran Conference (CELC) is an international fellowship of 34 Confessional Lutheran church bodies.

The CELC was founded in 1993 in Oberwesel, Germany with an initial thirteen church bodies. Plenary sessions are held every three years. To date there have been ten plenary meetings (1993, 1996, 1999, 2002, 2005, 2008, 2011, 2014, 2017, 2021), with regional meetings held in the intervening years.

The CELC rejects the 1999 Joint Declaration on the Doctrine of Justification signed between the Lutheran World Federation and the Catholic Church.

History
After the decline and dissolution of the Synodical Conference in the 1950s and 1960s, there was renewed interest for fellowship with other Lutheran church bodies. The Rev. Edgar Hoenecke called for a worldwide fellowship of Lutheran church bodies in the late 1960s.

Over the years, many people advocated for an international Lutheran organization and did much to help bring it about. However, three people are noted as having some of the biggest influence in helping to bring about a new international Lutheran organization: Pres. Gerhard Wilde of the Evangelisch-Lutherische Freikirche (ELFK), Pres. George Orvick of the Evangelical Lutheran Synod (ELS), and Prof. Wilbert Gawrisch of the Wisconsin Evangelical Lutheran Synod (WELS).

On April 27–29, 1993, the CELC was formed in Oberwesel, Germany with Lutheran church bodies from Africa, Asia, Australia, Europe, and North America.

Today, the CELC consists of thirty-four Lutheran church bodies worldwide.

Membership

Member church bodies confess "the canonical books of the Old and New Testament as the verbally inspired and inerrant Word of God and submit to this Word of God as the only infallible rule and authority in all matters of doctrine, faith, and life." They also accept "the Confessions of the Evangelical Lutheran Church contained in the Book of Concord of 1580, not in so far as, but because they are a correct exposition of the pure doctrine of the Word of God."

Members cannot be in fellowship with church bodies whose doctrine or practice deviate from the confessional standard of the CELC.

Member church bodies sorted by country/region in alphabetical order:

 Albania
Confessional Evangelical Lutheran Church of Albania
 Australia
Evangelical Lutheran Synod of Australia
 Bulgaria
Bulgarian Lutheran Church
 Cameroon
Lutheran Church of Cameroon
 Canada
WELS-Canada (Part of Wisconsin Evangelical Lutheran Synod)
 Chile
Christian Church of the Lutheran Reformation of Chile
 Czech Republic
Czech Evangelical Lutheran Church
 East Asia
East Asia Lutheran Synod
 Ethiopia
Lutheran Church of Ethiopia
 Finland
The Lutheran Confessional Church of Finland
St. Johannes Evangelical Lutheran Congregation
 Germany
Evangelical Lutheran Free Church
 Hong Kong
South Asian Lutheran Evangelical Mission
 India
Christ Evangelical Lutheran Ministries of India
Lutheran Mission of Salvation—India
 Indonesia
Lutheran Christian of Indonesia
 Japan
Lutheran Evangelical Christian Church
 Kenya
Lutheran Congregations in Mission for Christ—Kenya
 Latvia
Confessional Lutheran Church in Latvia
 Malawi
Lutheran Church of Central Africa
 Mexico
Confessional Evangelical Lutheran Church
 Nigeria
Christ the King Lutheran Church
All Saints Lutheran Church of Nigeria
 Norway
Lutheran Confessional Church
 Peru
Evangelical Lutheran Synod of Peru
 Portugal
Lutheran Church of Portugal
 Puerto Rico
Evangelical Lutheran Confessional Church
 Russia
Evangelical Lutheran Church - "Concord"
 South Korea
Seoul Lutheran Church
 Sweden
Lutheran Confessional Church
 Taiwan
Christ Lutheran Evangelical Church—Taiwan
 Ukraine
Ukrainian Lutheran Church
 United States of America
Evangelical Lutheran Synod
Wisconsin Evangelical Lutheran Synod
 Zambia
Lutheran Church of Central Africa

Conventions
The CELC holds a triennial convention in various countries around the world. The CELC conducts official business at these conventions. Representatives from all CELC member synods attend these conventions. The conventions center around a main doctrinal theme and include worship and Scripture-based essays.

References

External links

Scholarly articles about the CELC

 
Christian organizations established in 1993
International bodies of Lutheran denominations
International bodies of Lutheran denominations (currently existing)